The 1994 African Cup Winners' Cup football club tournament was won by DC Motema Pembe in two-legged final victory against Kenya Breweries, who were later renamed to Tusker F.C. in 1999. This was the twentieth season that the tournament took place for the winners of each African country's domestic cup. Thirty-five sides entered the competition and despite the relatively small number of competitors, nine teams were either disqualified or decided to withdraw during the preliminary and first rounds of the competition, where AS Cimelta and Black Africa withdrew before 1st leg of the preliminary round, Al Ahly withdraw before the 1st leg of the first round due to political reasons while Renaissance withdrew after the 1st leg of the first round. On the other hand, teams from Benin, Uganda and Zimbabwe were disqualified because their federations were in debt to CAF; Power Dynamos were disqualified because the Zambian federation did not name its entrant in time as well as the Mauritanian side ASC SNIM. Another two teams withdrew before the 1st leg of the second round, Rayon Sports from Rwanda and LPRC Oilers from Liberia.

Preliminary round

|}

First round

|}

Notes
1 KCC from Uganda, Postel Sport from Benin and Tanganda FC from Zimbabwe were disqualified because their federations were in debt to CAF.
2 Power Dynamos were disqualified because the Zambian federation did not name its entrant in time.

Second round

|}

Quarter-finals

|}

Semi-finals

|}

Final

|}

First leg

Second leg

External links
 Results available on CAF Official Website
 Results available on RSSSF

African Cup Winners' Cup
2